Bell codes or buzzer codes (US: Communication Signal Appliance codes) are a series of bells or buzzers used on passenger trains for communication between the driver and guard.

Great Britain and India

All codes, except 3—2—1, must be acknowledged by repeating the code received.

United States
In the United States, these are known as Communication Signal Appliance codes.

See also
 Railway block code - bell codes used between manually operated signal boxes
 Whistle codes - used by locomotives to communicate with signal boxes

References

Passenger rail transportation in the United States
Passenger rail transport in the United Kingdom
Passenger rail transport in India
Rail transport operations